Harry Moody (14 April 1832 – 30 March 1921) was an English first-class cricketer and civil servant.

The son of The Reverend Henry Riddell Moody, he was born in April 1832 at Chartham, Kent. He was educated at Eton College, where he was president of the Eton Society, before going up to King's College, Cambridge, where he was a fellow. A year prior to his graduation from Cambridge in 1858, Moody enlisted in the Oxfordshire Militia as a lieutenant. He continued his service in the Oxfordshire Militia following his graduation, gaining the rank of captain in August 1859. He played first-class cricket in 1860 for the Gentlemen of Kent against the Gentlemen of Marylebone Cricket Club at Canterbury. Batting twice in the match, Moody was dismissed for a single run in the Gentlemen of Kent first innings by Harvey Fellows, while in their second innings he was dismissed without scoring by C. Wright.

Moody was appointed aide-de-camp and secretary in 1861 to the Governor of New Brunswick. His appointment was brief, with him becoming auditor–general of Trinidad. From 1867–73, Moody served as secretary to the Governor of Nova Scotia. He served Lord Dufferin as his secretary during his tenure as Governor General of Canada. Returning to England, Moody was the secretary for the Canadian Pacific Railway Company in London for approximately twenty years from 1883. Married in 1863 to Florence Susan Parker (daughter of Neville Parker, Keeper of the Rolls, New Brunswick),with whom he had ten children.  Moody died in Devon at Bovey Tracey in March 1921.

References

External links

1832 births
1921 deaths
People from Chartham
People educated at Eton College
Alumni of King's College, Cambridge
Fellows of King's College, Cambridge
Oxfordshire and Buckinghamshire Light Infantry officers
English cricketers
Gentlemen of Kent cricketers
English civil servants